The 2011–12 season is FK Partizan's 6th season in Serbian SuperLiga. This article shows player statistics and all matches (official and friendly) that the club have and will play during the 2011–12 season.

Players

Squad information

Squad statistics

Top scorers
Includes all competitive matches. The list is sorted by shirt number when total goals are equal.

Transfers

In

Out

Competitions

Overview

Serbian SuperLiga

League table

Matches

Serbian Cup

UEFA Champions League

Qualifying rounds
By finishing 1st in the 2010–11 Serbian SuperLiga, Partizan qualified for the Champions League. They will start in the second qualifying round.

UEFA Europa League

Play-off round

Friendlies

Sponsors

See also
 List of FK Partizan seasons

References

External links
 Official website 
 Partizanopedia 2011-12  (in Serbian)

FK Partizan seasons
Partizan
Partizan
Serbian football championship-winning seasons